Exafroplacentalia or Notolegia is a clade of placental mammals proposed in 2001 on the basis of molecular research.

Exafroplacentalia places Xenarthra as a sister group to the Boreoeutheria (comprising Laurasiatheria and Euarchontoglires), thus making Afrotheria a primitive group of placental mammals (the group name roughly means "those which are not African placentals").

Classification

However, this classification makes the autapomorphy (character shared only among Exafroplacentalia) dubious: it is hard to classify a group by the absence of a feature (in this case "not coming from Africa"). Hence, several alternative hypotheses can be considered.

Alternative hypotheses

One alternative hypothesis is the Epitheria hypothesis:

Another alternative hypothesis is the Atlantogenata hypothesis:

Updated analysis of transposable element insertions around the time of divergence strongly supports the fourth hypothesis of a near-concomitant origin of the three superorders of mammals:

See also
Epitheria
Atlantogenata

References

Further reading

 
 
 
 

Obsolete mammal taxa